

Events

Pre-1600
 590 – Emperor Maurice proclaims his son Theodosius as co-emperor of the Byzantine Empire.
1021 – On the feast of Eid al-Adha, the death of the Fatimid caliph al-Hakim bi-Amr Allah, kept secret for six weeks, is announced, along with the succession of his son, al-Zahir li-i'zaz Din Allah. On the same day, al-Hakim's designated heir, Abd al-Rahim ibn Ilyas, is arrested in Damascus and brought to Egypt.
1027 – Pope John XIX crowns Conrad II as Holy Roman Emperor.
1169 – Saladin becomes the emir of Egypt.
1344 – The Siege of Algeciras, one of the first European military engagements where gunpowder was used, comes to an end.
1351 – Combat of the Thirty: Thirty Breton knights call out and defeat thirty English knights.
1484 – William Caxton prints his translation of Aesop's Fables.
1552 – Guru Amar Das becomes the Third Sikh guru.

1601–1900
1636 – Utrecht University is founded in the Netherlands.
1640 – The Royal Academy of Turku, the first university of Finland, is founded in the city of Turku by Queen Christina of Sweden at the proposal of Count Per Brahe.
1651 – Silver-loaded Spanish ship San José is pushed south by strong winds, subsequently it wrecks in the coast of southern Chile and its surviving crew is killed by indigenous Cuncos. 
1697 – Safavid government troops take control of Basra.
1700 – William Dampier is the first European to circumnavigate New Britain, discovering it is an island (which he names Nova Britannia) rather than part of New Guinea.
1812 – An earthquake devastates Caracas, Venezuela.
  1812   – A political cartoon in the Boston Gazette coins the term "gerrymander" to describe oddly shaped electoral districts designed to help incumbents win reelection.
1830 – The Book of Mormon is published in Palmyra, New York.
1839 – The first Henley Royal Regatta is held.
1871 – The elections of Commune council of the Paris Commune are held. 
1885 – The Métis people of the District of Saskatchewan under Louis Riel begin the North-West Rebellion against Canada.
1896 – An explosion at the Brunner Mine near Greymouth, New Zealand kills 65 coal miners in the country's worst industrial accident.

1901–present
1913 – First Balkan War: Bulgarian forces capture Adrianople.
1915 – The Vancouver Millionaires win the 1915 Stanley Cup Finals, the first championship played between the Pacific Coast Hockey Association and the National Hockey Association.
1917 – World War I: First Battle of Gaza: British troops are halted after 17,000 Turks block their advance.
1922 – The German Social Democratic Party is founded in Poland.
1931 – Swissair is founded as the national airline of Switzerland.
  1931   – Ho Chi Minh Communist Youth Union is founded in Vietnam.
1934 – The United Kingdom driving test is introduced.
1939 – Spanish Civil War: Nationalists begin their final offensive of the war.
1942 – World War II: The first female prisoners arrive at Auschwitz concentration camp in German-occupied Poland.
1945 – World War II: The Battle of Iwo Jima ends as the island is officially secured by American forces.
1954 – Nuclear weapons testing: The Romeo shot of Operation Castle is detonated at Bikini Atoll. Yield: 11 megatons.
1958 – The United States Army launches Explorer 3.
  1958   – The African Regroupment Party is launched at a meeting in Paris.
1967 – Ten thousand people gather for one of many Central Park be-ins in New York City.
1970 – South Vietnamese President Nguyễn Văn Thiệu implements a land reform program to solve the problem of land tenancy.
1971 – East Pakistan declares its independence from Pakistan to form Bangladesh and the Bangladesh Liberation War begins.
1975 – The Biological Weapons Convention comes into force.
1979 – Anwar al-Sadat, Menachem Begin and Jimmy Carter sign the Egypt–Israel peace treaty in Washington, D.C.
1981 – Social Democratic Party (UK) is founded as a party.
1982 – A groundbreaking ceremony for the Vietnam Veterans Memorial is held in Washington, D.C.
1991 – Argentina, Brazil, Uruguay and Paraguay sign the Treaty of Asunción, establishing Mercosur, the South Common Market.
1997 – Thirty-nine bodies are found in the Heaven's Gate mass suicides.
1998 – During the Algerian Civil War, the Oued Bouaicha massacre sees fifty-two people, mostly infants, killed with axes and knives.
2005 – Around 200,000 to 300,000 Taiwanese demonstrate in Taipei in opposition to the Anti-Secession Law of  China. 
2010 – The South Korean Navy corvette Cheonan is torpedoed, killing 46 sailors. After an international investigation, the President of the United Nations Security Council blames North Korea.
2017 – Russia-wide anti-corruption protests in 99 cities. The Levada Center survey showed that 38% of surveyed Russians supported protests and that 67 percent held Putin personally responsible for high-level corruption.

Births

Pre-1600
1516 – Conrad Gessner, Swiss botanist and zoologist (d. 1565)
1554 – Charles of Lorraine, duke of Mayenne (d. 1611)
1584 – John II, duke of Zweibrücken (d. 1635)

1601–1900
1633 – Mary Beale, British artist (d. 1699)
1634 – Domenico Freschi, Italian priest and composer (d. 1710)
1656 – Nicolaas Hartsoeker, Dutch mathematician and physicist (d. 1725)
1687 – Sophia Dorothea of Hanover, queen consort of Prussia (d. 1757)
1698 – Prokop Diviš, Czech priest, scientist and inventor (d. 1765)
1749 – William Blount, American politician (d. 1800)
1753 – Benjamin Thompson, American-French physicist and politician, Under-Secretary of State for the Colonies (d. 1814)
1773 – Nathaniel Bowditch, American mathematician and navigator (d. 1838)
1794 – Julius Schnorr von Carolsfeld, German painter (d. 1872)
1804 – David Humphreys Storer, American physician and academic (d. 1891)
1824 – Julie-Victoire Daubié, French journalist (d. 1874)
1829 – Théodore Aubanel, French poet (d. 1886)
1830 – Dewitt Clinton Senter, American politician, 18th Governor of Tennessee (d. 1898)
1842 – Alexandre Saint-Yves d'Alveydre, French occultist (d. 1909)
1850 – Edward Bellamy, American author, socialist, and utopian visionary (d. 1898)
1852 – Élémir Bourges, French author (d. 1925)
1854 – Maurice Lecoq, French target shooter (d. 1925)
1856 – William Massey, Irish-New Zealand farmer and politician, 19th Prime Minister of New Zealand (d. 1925)
1857 – Théodore Tuffier, French surgeon (d. 1929)
1859 – A. E. Housman, English poet and scholar (d. 1936)
  1859   – Adolf Hurwitz, German-Swiss mathematician and academic (d. 1919)
1860 – André Prévost, French tennis player (d. 1919)
1866 – Fred Karno, English producer and manager (d. 1941)
1868 – King Fuad I of Egypt (d. 1936)
1873 – Dorothea Bleek, South African-German anthropologist and philologist (d. 1948)
1874 – Robert Frost, American poet and playwright (d. 1963)
1875 – Max Abraham, Polish-German physicist and academic (d. 1922)
  1875   – Syngman Rhee, South Korean journalist and politician, 1st President of South Korea (d. 1965)
1876 – William of Wied, prince of Albania (d. 1945)
  1876   – Kate Richards O'Hare, American Socialist Party activist and editor (d. 1948)
1879 – Othmar Ammann, Swiss-American engineer, designed the George Washington Bridge and Verrazzano-Narrows Bridge (d. 1965)
  1879   – Waldemar Tietgens, German rower (d. 1917)
1881 – Guccio Gucci, Italian fashion designer, founded Gucci (d. 1953)
1882 – Hermann Obrecht, Swiss politician (d. 1940)
1884 – Wilhelm Backhaus, German pianist and educator (d. 1969)
  1884   – Georges Imbert, French chemical engineer and inventor (d. 1950)
1886 – Hugh Mulzac, Vincentian-American soldier and politician (d. 1971)
1888 – Elsa Brändström, Swedish nurse and philanthropist (d. 1948)
1893 – James Bryant Conant, American chemist, academic, and diplomat, 1st United States Ambassador to West Germany (d. 1978)
  1893   – Palmiro Togliatti, Italian journalist and politician, Italian Minister of Justice (d. 1964)
1894 – Viorica Ursuleac, Ukrainian-Romanian soprano and actress (d. 1985)
1895 – Vilho Tuulos, Finnish triple jumper (d. 1967)
1898 – Rudolf Dassler, German businessman, founded Puma SE (d. 1974)
  1898   – Charles Shadwell, English conductor and bandleader (d. 1979)
1900 – Angela Maria Autsch, German nun, murdered in Auschwitz helping Jewish prisoners (d. 1941)

1901–present
1904 – Joseph Campbell, American mythologist and author (d. 1987)
  1904   – Emilio Fernández, Mexican actor, director, and screenwriter (d. 1986)
  1904   – Attilio Ferraris, Italian footballer (d. 1947)
  1904   – Xenophon Zolotas, Greek economist and Prime Minister of Greece (d. 2004)
1905 – Monty Berman, English cinematographer and producer (d. 2006)
  1905   – André Cluytens, Belgian-French conductor and director (d. 1967)
  1905   – Viktor Frankl, Austrian neurologist and psychiatrist (d. 1997)
  1905   – Mona Williams, American novelist, short story writer and poet (d. 1991)
1906 – Rafael Méndez, Mexican trumpet player and composer (d. 1981)
  1906   – H. Radclyffe Roberts, American entomologist and museum administrator (d. 1982)
1907 – Azellus Denis, Canadian lawyer and politician, Postmaster General of Canada (d. 1991)
  1907   – Mahadevi Varma, Indian poet and activist (d. 1987)
1908 – Franz Stangl, Austrian-German SS officer (d. 1971)
1909 – Chips Rafferty, Australian actor (d. 1971)
1909 – Héctor José Cámpora, former President of Argentina (d. 1980)
1910 – K. W. Devanayagam, Sri Lankan lawyer and politician, 10th Sri Lankan Minister of Justice (d. 2002)
1911 – Lennart Atterwall, Swedish javelin thrower (d. 2001)
  1911   – J. L. Austin, English philosopher and academic (d. 1960)
  1911   – Bernard Katz, German-English biophysicist, Nobel Prize laureate (d. 2003)
  1911   – Tennessee Williams, American playwright, and poet (d. 1983)
1913 – Jacqueline de Romilly, Franco-Greek philologist, author, and scholar (d. 2010)
  1913   – Paul Erdős, Hungarian-Polish mathematician and academic (d. 1996)
1914 – Toru Kumon, Japanese mathematician and academic (d. 1995)
  1914   – William Westmoreland, American general (d. 2005)
1915 – Lennart Strandberg, Swedish sprinter (d. 1989)
  1915   – Hwang Sun-won, North Korean author and poet (d. 2000)
1916 – Christian B. Anfinsen, American biochemist and academic, Nobel Prize laureate (d. 1995)
  1916   – Bill Edrich, English cricketer and footballer (d. 1986)
  1916   – Sterling Hayden, American actor and author (d. 1986)
1917 – Rufus Thomas, American R&B singer-songwriter (d. 2001)
1919 – Strother Martin, American actor (d. 1980)
  1919   – Roger Leger, Canadian ice hockey player (d. 1965)
1920 – Sergio Livingstone, Chilean footballer and journalist (d. 2012)
1922 – William Milliken, American politician, 44th Governor of Michigan (d. 2019)
  1922   – Oscar Sala, Italian-Brazilian physicist and academic (d. 2010)
  1922   – Guido Stampacchia, Italian mathematician and academic (d. 1978)
1923 – Gert Bastian, German general and politician (d. 1992)
  1923   – Bob Elliott, American comedian, actor, and screenwriter (d. 2016)
1925 – Maqsood Ahmed, Pakistani cricketer (d. 1999)
  1925   – Pierre Boulez, French pianist, composer, and conductor (d. 2016)
  1925   – Vesta Roy, American politician, Governor of New Hampshire (d. 2002)
  1925   – Edward Graham, Baron Graham of Edmonton, English soldier and politician (d. 2020)
  1925   – Ben Mondor, Canadian-American businessman (d. 2010)
  1925   – James Moody, American saxophonist and composer (d. 2010)
1927 – Harold Chapman, English photographer
1929 – Edward Sorel, American illustrator and caricaturist
  1929   – Edwin Turney, American businessman, co-founded Advanced Micro Devices (d. 2008)
1930 – Sandra Day O'Connor, American lawyer and jurist
  1930   – Gregory Corso, American poet (d. 2001)
1931 – Leonard Nimoy, American actor (d. 2015)
1932 – Leroy Griffith, American businessman
  1932   – James Andrew Harris, American chemist and academic (d. 2000)
1933 – Tinto Brass, Italian director and screenwriter
1934 – Alan Arkin, American actor
  1934   – Edvaldo Alves de Santa Rosa, Brazilian footballer (d. 2002)
1937 – Wayne Embry, American basketball player and manager
  1937   – Barbara Jones, American sprinter
  1937   – James Lee, Canadian businessman and politician, 26th Premier of Prince Edward Island
1938 – Norman Ackroyd, English painter and illustrator
  1938   – Anthony James Leggett, English-American physicist and academic, Nobel Prize laureate
1940 – James Caan, American actor and singer (d. 2022)
  1940   – Nancy Pelosi, American lawyer and politician, 52nd Speaker of the United States House of Representatives
1941 – Richard Dawkins, Kenyan-English ethologist, biologist, and academic
  1941   – Lella Lombardi, Italian racing driver (d. 1992)
1942 – Erica Jong, American novelist and poet
1943 – Mustafa Kalemli, Turkish physician and politician, Turkish Minister of the Interior
  1943   – Bob Woodward, American journalist and author
1944 – Diana Ross, American singer-songwriter, producer, and actress 
1945 – Paul Bérenger, Mauritian politician, Prime Minister of Mauritius
  1945   – Mikhail Voronin, Russian gymnast and coach (d. 2004)
1946 – Johnny Crawford, American actor and singer (d. 2021)
  1946   – Alain Madelin, French politician, French Minister of Finance
1947 – Subhash Kak, Indian-American professor and author
  1947   – John Rowles, New Zealand-Australian singer-songwriter
1948 – Kyung-wha Chung, South Korean violinist and educator
  1948   – Richard Tandy, English pianist and keyboard player
  1948   – Steven Tyler, American singer-songwriter and actor 
1949 – Jon English, English-Australian singer-songwriter and actor (d. 2016)
  1949   – Rudi Koertzen, South African cricketer and umpire (d. 2022)
  1949   – Vicki Lawrence, American actress, comedian, talk show host, and singer
  1949   – Fran Sheehan, American bass player 
  1949   – Patrick Süskind, German author and screenwriter
  1949   – Ernest Lee Thomas, American actor
1950 – Teddy Pendergrass, American singer-songwriter (d. 2010)
  1950   – Graham Barlow, English cricketer
  1950   – Martin Short, Canadian-American actor, screenwriter, and producer
  1950   – Alan Silvestri, American composer and conductor
1951 – Željko Pavličević, Croatian professional basketball coach and former professional player
  1951   – Carl Wieman, American physicist and academic, Nobel Prize laureate
1952 – Didier Pironi, French racing driver (d. 1987)
1953 – Lincoln Chafee, American academic and politician, 74th Governor of Rhode Island
  1953   – Elaine Chao, Taiwanese-American banker and politician, 24th United States Secretary of Labor
  1953   – Tatyana Providokhina, Russian runner
1954 – Clive Palmer, Australian businessman and politician
  1954   – Curtis Sliwa, American talk show host and activist, founded Guardian Angels
  1954   – Dorothy Porter, Australian poet and playwright (d. 2008)
1956 – Charly McClain, American country music singer
  1956   – Park Won-soon, South Korean lawyer and politician, 35th Mayor of Seoul (d. 2020)
1957 – Fiona Bruce, Scottish lawyer and politician
  1957   – Leeza Gibbons, American talk show host and television personality
  1957   – Paul Morley, English journalist, producer, and author
  1957   – Shirin Neshat, Iranian visual artist
1958 – Elio de Angelis, Italian racing driver (d. 1986)
1960 – Marcus Allen, American football player and sportscaster
  1960   – Jennifer Grey, American actress and dancer
  1960   – Graeme Rutjes, Australian-Dutch footballer
1961 – William Hague, English historian and politician, First Secretary of State
1962 – Richard Coles, English pianist, saxophonist, and priest 
  1962   – Kevin Seitzer, American baseball player and coach
  1962   – Yuri Gidzenko, Russian pilot and cosmonaut
  1962   – John Stockton, American basketball player and coach
  1962   – Eric Allan Kramer, American-Canadian actor
1963 – Natsuhiko Kyogoku, Japanese author
1964 – Martin Bella, Australian rugby league player
  1964   – Martin Donnelly, Irish racing driver
  1964   – Maria Miller, English businessman and politician, Secretary of State for Culture, Media and Sport
  1964   – Ulf Samuelsson, Swedish-American ice hockey player and coach
1965 – Trey Azagthoth, American guitarist, songwriter, and producer 
  1965   – Violeta Szekely, Romanian runner
1966 – Michael Imperioli, American actor and screenwriter
1967 – Jason Chaffetz, American politician
1968 – Laurent Brochard, French cyclist
  1968   – Kenny Chesney, American singer-songwriter and guitarist
  1968   – James Iha, American guitarist and songwriter
1969 – Alessandro Moscardi, Italian rugby player
1970 – Paul Bosvelt, Dutch footballer
  1970   – Jelle Goes, Dutch footballer and coach
  1970   – Thomas Kyparissis, Greek footballer
  1970   – Martin McDonagh, English-born Irish playwright, screenwriter, and director
  1971   – Martyn Day, Scottish politician
  1971   – Erick Morillo, Colombian-American disc jockey, record label owner, and music producer (d. 2020)
  1971   – Rennae Stubbs, Australian tennis player and sportscaster
  1971   – Paul Williams, English footballer and manager
1972 – Leslie Mann, American actress
  1972   – Jason Maxwell, American baseball player
1973 – Larry Page, American computer scientist and businessman, co-founder of Google
  1973   – T. R. Knight, American actor
1974 – Irina Spîrlea, Romanian tennis player
  1974   – Vadimas Petrenko, Lithuanian footballer
  1974   – Michael Peca, Canadian ice hockey player and coach
1976 – Amy Smart, American actress and former model
  1976   – Alex Varas, Chilean footballer
  1976   – Eirik Verås Larsen, Norwegian sprint kayaker
1977 – Kevin Davies, English footballer
  1977   – Bianca Kajlich, American actress
  1977   – Sylvain Grenier, Canadian wrestler
1978 – Anastasia Kostaki, Greek basketball player
1979 – Nacho Novo, Spanish footballer
  1979   – Ben Blair, New Zealand rugby union footballer
  1979   – Hiromi Uehara, Japanese pianist and composer
  1979   – Pierre Womé, Cameroonian footballer
  1979   – Juliana Paes, Brazilian actress
1980 – Margaret Brennan, American journalist
  1980   – Son Ho-young, South Korean singer
  1980   – Richie Wellens, English footballer
1981 – Sébastien Centomo, Canadian ice hockey player
  1981   – Baruch Dego, Ethiopian-Israeli footballer
  1981   – Massimo Donati, Italian footballer
  1981   – Josh Wilson, American baseball player
1982 – Mikel Arteta, Spanish footballer
  1982   – Brendan Ryan, American baseball player
  1982   – Nate Kaeding, American football player
1983 – Andreas Hinkel, German footballer
  1983   – Floriana Lima, American actress
  1983   – Roman Bednář, Czech footballer
  1983   – Mike Mondo, American wrestler
1984 – Jimmy Howard, American ice hockey player
  1984   – Drew Mitchell, Australian rugby player
  1984   – Felix Neureuther, German skier
  1984   – Marco Stier, German footballer
  1984   – Gregory Strydom, Zimbabwean cricketer
  1984   – Sara Jean Underwood, American model, television host, and actress
1985 – Keira Knightley, English actress 
  1985   – Matt Grevers, American swimmer
  1985   – Jonathan Groff, American actor and singer
  1985   – Prosper Utseya, Zimbabwean cricketer
1986 – Maxime Biset, Belgian footballer
  1986   – Rob Kearney, Irish rugby player
  1986   – Emma Laine, Finnish tennis player
1987 – Kim Dong-suk, South Korean footballer
  1987   – Jermichael Finley, American football player
  1987   – Steven Fletcher, Scottish footballer
1989 – Simon Kjær, Danish footballer
  1989   – Von Miller, American football player
1990 – Choi Woo-shik, South Korean actor
  1990   – Matteo Guidicelli, Filipino actor, model, singer and former kart racer
  1990   – Patrick Ekeng, Cameroonian footballer (d. 2016)
  1990   – Yuya Takaki, Japanese idol, singer, dancer, model and actor
  1990   – Xiumin, South Korean singer and actor
1991 – Matt Davidson, American baseball player
1992 – Nina Agdal, Danish model
  1992   – Stoffel Vandoorne, Belgian racing driver
1994 – Alison Van Uytvanck, Belgian tennis player
  1994   – Paige VanZant, American mixed martial artist and model
  1994   – Jed Wallace, English footballer
  1994   – Marcela Zacarías, Mexican tennis player
1996 – Zane Musgrove, New Zealand rugby league player
  1996   – Kathryn Bernardo, Filipino actress
1998 – Satoko Miyahara, Japanese figure skater
2003 – Bhad Bhabie, American rapper and social media personality
2004 – Awra Briguela, Filipino actor and comedian

Deaths

Pre-1600
 752 – Pope-elect Stephen
 809 – Ludger, Frisian missionary
 903 – Sugawara no Michizane, Japanese poet
 908 – Ai, emperor of the Tang Dynasty (b. 892)
 922 – Mansur Al-Hallaj, Persian mystic and poet (b. 858)
 929 – Wang Du, Chinese warlord and governor (jiedushi)
 973 – Guntram ("the Rich"), Frankish nobleman
 983 – 'Adud al-Dawla, Iranian ruler (b. 936)
1091 – Wallada bint al-Mustakfi, Andalusian poet
1130 – Sigurd the Crusader, Norwegian king (b. 1090)
1132 – Geoffrey of Vendôme, French cardinal and theologian (b. 1065)
1212 – Sancho I of Portugal (b. 1154)
1242 – William de Forz, 3rd Earl of Albemarle
1324 – Marie de Luxembourg, Queen of France (b. 1304)
1326 – Alessandra Giliani, anatomist (b. c. 1307)
1350 – Alfonso XI of Castile (b. 1312)
1402 – David Stewart, Duke of Rothesay, heir to the throne of Scotland (b. 1378)
1437 – Walter Stewart, Earl of Atholl, Scottish nobleman and regicide
1517 – Heinrich Isaac, Flemish composer (b. 1450)
1535 – Georg Tannstetter, Austrian mathematician, astronomer, and cartographer (b. 1482)
1546 – Thomas Elyot, English scholar and diplomat (b. 1490)
1566 – Antonio de Cabezón, Spanish organist and composer (b. 1510)

1601–1900
1625 – Giambattista Marini, Italian poet (b. 1569)
1649 – John Winthrop, English lawyer and politician, 2nd Governor of the Massachusetts Bay Colony
1679 – Johannes Schefferus, Swedish historian and author (b. 1621)
1697 – Godfrey McCulloch, Scottish politician (b. 1640)
1726 – John Vanbrugh, English playwright and architect, designed Blenheim Palace and Castle Howard (b. 1664)
1772 – Charles Pinot Duclos, French author and politician (b. 1704)
1776 – Samuel Ward, American politician, 31st and 33rd Governor of the Colony of Rhode Island and Providence Plantations (b. 1725)
1780 – Charles I, Duke of Brunswick-Wolfenbüttel (b. 1713)
1793 – John Mudge, English physician and engineer (b. 1721)
1797 – James Hutton, Scottish geologist and physician (b. 1726)
1814 – Joseph-Ignace Guillotin, French physician and politician (b. 1738)
1827 – Ludwig van Beethoven, German pianist and composer (b. 1770)
1858 – John Addison Thomas, American lieutenant, engineer, and politician, 3rd United States Assistant Secretary of State (b. 1811)
1862 – Uriah P. Levy, American commander (b. 1792)
1881 – Roman Sanguszko, Polish general and activist (b. 1800)
1885 – Anson Stager, American general and businessman, co-founded Western Union (b. 1825)
1888 – Barghash bin Said of Zanzibar (b. 1837)
1892 – Walt Whitman, American poet, essayist, and journalist (b. 1819)

1901–present
1902 – Cecil Rhodes, English-South African colonialist, businessman and politician, 6th Prime Minister of the Cape Colony (b. 1853)
1905 – Maurice Barrymore, American actor (b. 1849)
1910 – Auguste Charlois, French astronomer (b. 1864)
1920 – William Chester Minor, American surgeon and lexicographer (b. 1834)
1923 – Sarah Bernhardt, French actress and screenwriter (b. 1844)
1926 – Constantin Fehrenbach, German lawyer and politician, Chancellor of Germany (b. 1852)
1932 – Henry M. Leland, American machinist, inventor, engineer, automotive entrepreneur and founder of Cadillac and Lincoln (b. 1843)
1934 – John Biller, American jumper and discus thrower (b. 1877)
1940 – Wilhelm Anderson, German-Estonian astrophysicist (b. 1880)
  1940   – Spyridon Louis, Greek runner (b. 1873)
1942 – Jimmy Burke, American baseball player and manager (b. 1874)
  1942   – Carolyn Wells, American novelist and poet (b. 1862)
1945 – David Lloyd George, English-Welsh lawyer and politician, Prime Minister of the United Kingdom (b. 1863)
1951 – James F. Hinkle, American banker and politician, 6th Governor of New Mexico (b. 1864)
1954 – Charles Perrin, French rower (b. 1875)
1957 – Édouard Herriot, French politician, Prime Minister of France (b. 1872)
  1957   – Max Ophüls, German-American director and screenwriter (b. 1902)
1958 – Phil Mead, English cricketer and footballer (b. 1887)
1959 – Raymond Chandler, American crime novelist and screenwriter (b. 1888)
1966 – Victor Hochepied, French swimmer (b. 1883)
  1966   – Cyril Hume, American novelist and screenwriter (b. 1900)
1969 – John Kennedy Toole, American novelist (b. 1937)
1973 – Noël Coward,  English playwright, actor, and composer  (b. 1899)
  1973   – Johnny Drake, American football player (b. 1916)
1979 – Beauford Delaney, American-French painter (b. 1901)
  1979   – Jean Stafford, American author and academic (b. 1915)
1980 – Roland Barthes, French linguist and critic (b. 1915)
1983 – Anthony Blunt, English historian and spy (b. 1907)
1984 – Ahmed Sékou Touré, Guinean politician, 1st President of Guinea (b. 1922)
1987 – Eugen Jochum, German conductor (b. 1902)
  1987   – Walter Abel, American actor (b. 1898)
1990 – Halston, American fashion designer (b. 1932)
1992 – Barbara Frum, American-Canadian journalist and radio host (b. 1937)
1993 – Louis Falco, American dancer and choreographer (b. 1942)
1995 – Eazy-E, American rapper and producer (b. 1964)
1996 – Edmund Muskie, American lieutenant, lawyer, and politician, 58th United States Secretary of State (b. 1914)
  1996   – David Packard, American engineer and businessman, co-founded Hewlett-Packard (b. 1912)
  1996   – John Snagge, English journalist (b. 1904)
2000 – Alex Comfort, English physician and author (b. 1920)
2002 – Randy Castillo, American drummer and songwriter (b. 1950)
2003 – Daniel Patrick Moynihan, American sociologist and politician, 12th United States Ambassador to the United Nations (b. 1927)
2004 – Jan Sterling, American actress (b. 1921)
2005 – James Callaghan, English lieutenant and politician, Prime Minister of the United Kingdom (b. 1912)
  2005   – Frederick Rotimi Williams, Nigerian lawyer and politician (b. 1920)
2006 – Anil Biswas, Indian journalist and politician (b. 1944)
  2006   – Paul Dana, American racing driver (b. 1975)
  2006   – Nikki Sudden, English singer-songwriter and guitarist (b. 1956)
2008 – Robert Fagles, American poet and academic (b. 1933)
  2008   – Manuel Marulanda, Colombian rebel leader (b. 1930)
2009 – Shane McConkey, Canadian skier and BASE jumper (b. 1969)
  2009   – Arne Bendiksen, Norwegian singer and composer (b. 1926)
2010 – Charles Ryskamp, American art collector and curator (b. 1928)
2011 – Roger Abbott, English-Canadian actor, producer, and screenwriter (b. 1946)
  2011   – Geraldine Ferraro, American lawyer and politician (b. 1935)
  2011   – Diana Wynne Jones, English author (b. 1934)
2012 – Sisto Averno, American football player (b. 1925)
  2012   – Michael Begley, Irish carpenter and politician (b. 1932)
  2012   – Thomas M. Cover, American theorist and academic (b. 1938)
  2012   – David Craighead, American organist and educator (b. 1924)
  2012   – Manik Godghate, Indian poet and educator (b. 1937)
  2012   – Helmer Ringgren, Swedish theologian and academic (b. 1917)
2013 – Tom Boerwinkle, American basketball player and sportscaster (b. 1945)
  2013   – Krzysztof Kozłowski, Polish journalist and politician, Polish Minister of Interior (b. 1931)
  2013   – Dave Leggett, American baseball player (b. 1933)
  2013   – Don Payne, American screenwriter and producer (b. 1964)
2014 – Roger Birkman, American psychologist and author (b. 1919)
  2014   – Dick Guidry, American businessman and politician (b. 1929)
  2014   – Marcus Kimball, Baron Kimball, English politician (b. 1928)
2015 – Dinkha IV, Iraqi patriarch (b. 1935)
  2015   – Friedrich L. Bauer, German mathematician, computer scientist, and academic (b. 1924)
  2015   – Tomas Tranströmer, Swedish poet, translator, and  psychologist  Nobel Prize laureate (b. 1931)
2016 – Jim Harrison, American novelist, essayist, and poet (b. 1937)
2018 – Fabrizio Frizzi, Italian television presenter (b. 1958)

Holidays and observances
Christian feast days:
Castulus
Emmanuel and companions
Felicitas
Harriet Monsell (Church of England)
Larissa
Ludger
Richard Allen (Episcopal Church (USA))
March 26 (Eastern Orthodox liturgics)
Independence Day and National Day (Bangladesh), celebrates the declaration of independence from Pakistan in 1971.
Martyr's Day or Day of Democracy (Mali)
Prince Kūhiō Day (Hawaii, United States)
Purple Day (Canada and United States)
Synaxis of the Archangel Gabriel (Eastern Christianity)

References

External links

 BBC: On This Day
 
 Historical Events on March 26

Days of the year
March